Dosa may refer to:

People
 Bogoljub Mitić Đoša (1968 - 2017), Serbian actor
 Csaba Dosa (born 1951), Romanian athlete
 Dosa ben Harkinas, Jewish Tanna sage
 Dosa ben Saadia (935 - 1018), Talmudic scholar and philosopher
 Edward Dosa-Wea Neufville (born 1976), Liberian sprinter
 Géza Dósa (1846–1871), Hungarian painter
 Hanina ben Dosa, first-century Jewish scholar
 Oba Cadius Dosa Akran, Nigerian politician
 Sara Dosa, American documentary director and producer

Football
 Dominic Old Scholars Association SC, Australian football club
 DOSA-ALAVER, Dominican football team
 DOSA Football Club, Australian Australian rules football club

Other
Doṣa or dosha, a concept in Ayurvedic medicine
Dosa (food), South Indian rice crepe
Dosa (moth), a genus of moths
Dosa plaza, chain of fast food restaurants
Dosa, fashion label run by Christina Kim
DOSA, the Department of Social Affairs from the British comedy television series The Thick of It
DOSA, the Department of Statistical Anomalies from the American fantasy-adventure television series The Librarians (2014 TV series)

See also
 Dossa Júnior (born 1986), Portuguese football player
 Dhosa, Jaynagar, a village and archeological site in India